William David Bathe  (born October 14, 1960) is an American former professional baseball catcher.

In his MLB career, Bathe had eight home runs, 29 runs batted in, and had a career batting average of .213. He played for the Giants when they reached the 1989 World Series against Oakland.

Bathe was the 5th player in the National League to hit a home run in his first World Series at-bat. He is now a captain for the Tucson Fire Department and a paramedic.

References

External links

Bill Bathe at Pura Pelota (Venezuelan Professional Baseball League)

1960 births
Living people
American expatriate baseball players in Japan
Baseball players from California
Fullerton College alumni
Fullerton Hornets baseball players
Iowa Cubs players
Major League Baseball catchers
Navegantes del Magallanes players
American expatriate baseball players in Venezuela
Nippon Ham Fighters players
Oakland Athletics players
Pepperdine University alumni
Pepperdine Waves baseball players
Phoenix Firebirds players
San Francisco Giants players
San Jose Missions players
Sportspeople from Downey, California
Tacoma Tigers players
Tigres de Aragua players
West Haven A's players